Oncideres miliaris is a species of beetle in the family Cerambycidae. It was described by Schönherr in 1817. It is known from French Guiana.

References

miliaris
Beetles described in 1817